Tymovirales is an order of viruses with five families. The group consists of viruses which have positive-sense, single-stranded RNA genomes. Their genetic material is protected by a special coat protein.

Description
Tymoviruses are mainly plant pathogens first described in 2004. They are characterised by similarities in their replication-associated polyproteins. These account for the majority of their genomic coding capacity. They are considered to form a group, phylogenetically, referred to as flexiviruses, with filamentous virions.

References

Bibliography

External links
 ICTV Virus Taxonomy 2009 
 UniProt Taxonomy

 
Virus orders
Riboviria